Jorge Bruni (1941 – 13 December 2020) was an Uruguayan politician who served as Minister of the Interior.

References

1941 births
2020 deaths
Uruguayan politicians